The 1922 North Dakota Flickertails football team, also known as the Nodaks, was an American football team that represented the University of North Dakota in the North Central Conference (NCC) during the 1922 college football season. In its fourth year under head coach Paul J. Davis, the team compiled a 4–3 record (3–1 against NCC opponents), finished in third place out of nine teams in the NCC, and outscored opponents by a total of 49 to 40.

Schedule

References

North Dakota
North Dakota Fighting Hawks football seasons
North Dakota Flickertails football